Nej  is a village in the southern state of Karnataka, India. It is located in the Chikodi taluk of Belgaum district in Karnataka.

Demographics
At the 2001 India census, Nej had a population of 6514 with 3398 males and 3116 females.
And there is Temple of Kadasiddeshwar and Bireshwar 
Nej is one of the best village.

Nearby villages
Vadagol, Nagaral, Nanadi, Galataga, Shamanewadi, Bedakihal.

Hobali of Nej
Sadalaga

See also
 Belgaum
 Districts of Karnataka

References

External links
 http://Belgaum.nic.in/

Villages in Belagavi district